The 2022–23 ISU Junior Grand Prix was the 25th season of a series of junior international competitions organized by the International Skating Union. It is the junior-level complement to the 2022–23 ISU Grand Prix of Figure Skating. Skaters compete for medals in the disciplines of men's singles, women's singles, pairs, and ice dance, as well as for qualifying points. The top six from each discipline will qualify for the 2022–23 Junior Grand Prix Final, to be held together with the senior final.

Competitions 
The locations of the JGP events change yearly. In the 2022–23 season, the series is composed of the following events in autumn 2022:

Entries 
Skaters who reach the age of 13 before July 1, 2022, but have not turned 19 (singles and females of the other two disciplines) or 21 (male pair skaters and ice dancers) are eligible to compete on the junior circuit. Competitors are chosen by their countries according to their federation's selection procedures. The number of entries allotted to each ISU member federation was to be determined by their skaters' placements at the 2022 World Junior Championships in each discipline.

Number of entries per discipline 
Based on the results of the 2022 World Junior Championships, each ISU member nation was allowed to field the following number of entries per event.

Singles and ice dance

Pairs

Medal summary

Medalists

Men

Women

Pairs

Ice dance

Medal table

Qualification 
At each event, skaters earned points toward qualification for the Junior Grand Prix Final. Following the 7th event, the top six highest scoring skaters/couples advanced to the Final. The points earned per placement were as follows:

There were originally seven tie-breakers in cases of a tie in overall points:
 Highest placement at an event. If a skater placed 1st and 3rd, the tiebreaker is the 1st place, and that beats a skater who placed 2nd in both events.
 Highest combined total scores in both events. If a skater earned 200 points at one event and 250 at a second, that skater would win in the second tie-break over a skater who earned 200 points at one event and 150 at another.
 Participated in two events.
 Highest combined scores in the free skating/free dance portion of both events.
 Highest individual score in the free skating/free dance portion from one event.
 Highest combined scores in the short program/short dance of both events.
 Highest number of total participants at the events.

If a tie remained, it was considered unbreakable and the tied skaters all advanced to the Junior Grand Prix Final.

Qualification standings
Bold denotes Junior Grand Prix Final qualification.

Qualifiers

Records and achievements

Records 

The following new junior ISU best scores were set during this season:

Achievements 
  Hannah Lim / Ye Quan (gold at JGP France) are the first South Korean and the first Asian ice dance team to win an ISU Junior Grand Prix title.
 In the junior women's free skating at JGP Czech Republic,  Mao Shimada became the twenty-first woman to successfully land a triple Axel in international competition.
  Kateřina Mrázková / Daniel Mrázek (gold at JGP Czech Republic) are the first Czech ice dance team to win an ISU Grand Prix at either the junior or senior level. They also recorded the highest-ever TES for a junior ice dance team in the rhythm dance and broke the junior record for the rhythm dance score.
  Phebe Bekker / James Hernandez (silver at JGP Czech Republic) and  Nao Kida / Masaya Morita (bronze at JGP Czech Republic) are the first ice dance teams from their respective countries to win an ISU Junior Grand Prix medal.
 At JGP Italy,  Kateřina Mrázková / Daniel Mrázek recorded the highest-ever TES for a junior ice dance team in the rhythm dance and broke their own junior record for the rhythm dance score.
  Nikolaj Memola (gold at 2022–23 JGP Final) is the first Italian men's singles skater to win the Junior Grand Prix Final. He also won Italy's first Grand Prix Final medal in men's singles at either the junior or senior level.
  Hannah Lim / Ye Quan (silver at 2022–23 JGP Final) are the first South Korean and the first Asian ice dance team to win a Grand Prix Final medal at either the junior or senior level.
  Kateřina Mrázková / Daniel Mrázek (bronze at 2022–23 JGP Final) won Czech Republic's first Grand Prix Final medal in ice dance at either the junior or senior level.

Top JGP scores

Men

Best total score

Best short program score

Best free skating score

Women

Best total score

Best short program score

Best free skating score

Pairs

Best total score

Best short program score

Best free skating score

Ice dance

Best total score

Best rhythm dance score

Best free dance score

Notes

References

External links 
 ISU Junior Grand Prix at the International Skating Union

ISU Junior Grand Prix
Junior Grand Prix
ISU Junior Grand Prix